Kraljica (The Queen) is a fourth studio album by Bosnian pop-folk recording artist Seka Aleksić. It was released 23 November 2007 through the record label Grand Production.

Track listing
Kraljica (Queen)
Aspirin
Boli stara ljubav (Old Love Hurts)
Poslednji let (Final Flight)
Nije ona ta (She's Not That One)
Milostinja (Charity)
Hirošima (Hiroshima)
Tesna koža (Tight Skin)
Impulsi (Impulses)
Sokole moj (My Falcon)
Reci gde smo mi (Say Where We Are)

References

2007 albums
Seka Aleksić albums
Grand Production albums